Milt is a masculine given name, nearly always a short form (hypocorism) of Milton. People named Milt include:

 Milt Bernhart (1926–2004), American jazz trombonist
 Milt Bocek (1912–2007), American Major League Baseball player
 Milt Drewer (1923-2012), American college football head coach and CEO of First American Bank of Virginia
 Milt Franklyn (1897–1962), American musical composer and arranger who worked on the Looney Tunes animated cartoons
 Milt Gabler (1911–2001), American record producer, responsible for many innovations in the recording industry
 Milt Harradence (1922–2008), controversial Canadian criminal lawyer, pilot, politician and judge
 Milt Hinton (1910–2000), American jazz double bassist and photographer
 Milt Jackson (1923–1999), American jazz vibraphonist
 Milt Jackson (American football) (1943–2005), American football coach
 Milt Larkin (1910-1996), American jazz trumpeter, bandleader and singer
 Milt McColl (born 1959), American retired National Football League player
 Milt Plum (born 1935), American retired National Football League quarterback
 Milt Ramírez (born 1950), Puerto Rican retired Major League Baseball player
 Milt Raskin (1916–1977), American swing jazz pianist
 Milt Rehnquist (1892–1971), American National Football League player
 Milt Sunde (born 1942), American retired National Football League player
 Milt Thompson (baseball) (born 1959), American retired Major League Baseball player
 Milt Wagner (born 1963), American basketball player and coach
 Milt Woodard (1911–1996), American sports writer and President and Commissioner of the American Football League

Hypocorisms
Masculine given names